The 1990 Giro d'Italia was the 73rd edition of the Giro d'Italia, one of cycling's Grand Tours. The Giro began in Bari, with an individual time trial on 18 May, and Stage 10 occurred on 27 May with a stage to Cuneo. The race finished in Milan on 6 June.

Stage 1
18 May 1990 — Bari to Bari,  (ITT)

Stage 2
19 May 1990 — Bari to Sala Consilina,

Stage 3
20 May 1990 — Sala Consilina to Mount Vesuvius,

Stage 4a
21 May 1990 — Ercolano to Nola,

Stage 4b
21 May 1990 — Nola to Sora,

Stage 5
22 May 1990 — Sora to Teramo,

Stage 6
23 May 1990 — Teramo to Fabriano,

Stage 7
24 May 1990 — Fabriano to Vallombrosa,

Stage 8
25 May 1990 — Reggello to Marina di Pietrasanta,

Stage 9
26 May 1990 — La Spezia to Langhirano,

Stage 10
27 May 1990 — Grinzane Cavour to Cuneo,  (ITT)

References

1990 Giro d'Italia
Giro d'Italia stages